The Sderot Cinematheque is a film archive operating in Sderot, Israel  since December 1999. The Cinematheque was founded in cooperation between Sapir Academic College (thanks to Professor Haim Bereshit, the manager of the Media and Cinema School at the college) and Sderot mayor Eli Moyal.

There are two film screening halls at the Cinematheque, which's number of seats together add up to around 400.

Of the many events hosted by the Cinematheque, the Cinema South International Film Festival, in which films from all over the world and Israel, as well as Final Film Projects of Sapir Academic College graduates are screened, is the Cinematheque's biggest event of the year.

Manager of the Sapir Academic College's Media and Cinema School Professor Haim Bereshit and mayor of Sderot Eli Moyal had the initial vision of founding the Cinematheque. The Cinematheque is the first educational and cultural cinema institution in the Southern District of Israel. The main goals of the Cinematheque were bringing about culture into the daily lives of the Southern District population, as well as minimizing the gaps between the Center of Israel and the South's populations. By definition, a Cinematheque is an institution that encourages the love of film. The Cinematheque in Sderot gives every person the chance to enjoy its activities, without worrying about their socio-economic status. One of its main goals is the promoting of the Israeli Cinema's various activities, including festivals, seminars, special screenings, meetings with creators, musical and cultural events, courses, and workshops. One of the unique things about the Cinematheque is that it exposes the audience to several Israeli/foreign productions, documentaries/feature films, and more, accompanied by creators who bring up social issues using cinematic language. The Cinematheque is active seven days a week, with an average of three to six screenings per day.

External links
Sderot Cinematheque Official Website

1999 establishments in Israel
Film archives in Israel
Cinemas and movie theatres in Israel